Rudolf Lüters (May 10, 1883 – December 24, 1945) was a German general who served in the Wehrmacht, during the Second World War.

Biography  
He joined the army on November 2, 1902 as Fahnenjunker and participated in World War I where he was wounded twice, in September 1914 and in October 1915.

During World War II, he was appointed commander of the 223rd infantry division on May 6, 1941, participating with this unit in the invasion of the Soviet Union until October 19.

On November 1, 1942, he was appointed commander of German troops in Croatia. He was promoted to General der Infanterie on February 1, 1943. He received the German Cross in Gold on April 30, 1943 and became the first commander of the newly created XV Mountain Corps on August 25. He participated in numerous anti-partisan operations in Croatia, notably in the Case White operation led by Alexander Löhr.

On July 31, 1944, Lüters left the army and retired. Captured by the Soviets at the end of the war, he died in detention in Russia on Christmas Eve 1945.

Sources
 Dermot Bradley: Die Generale des Heeres 1921–1945 Band 7 Knabe-Luz, Biblio Verlag, Bissendorf 2004, S. 651–652.

1883 births
1945 deaths
Generals of Infantry (Wehrmacht)
German people who died in Soviet detention
German prisoners of war in World War II held by the Soviet Union
Military personnel from Darmstadt
Recipients of the Gold German Cross
Recipients of the Pour le Mérite (military class)
German Army personnel of World War I
German Army generals of World War II